Trevor Rogers may refer to:

 Trevor Rogers (baseball) (born 1997), American baseball pitcher
 Trevor Rogers (politician) (born 1943), New Zealand politician